Léon Garnier (1856 in Lyon – 1905 in Meung-sur-Loire (Loiret)) was a French 19th-century composer and lyricist.

Works (selection) 

 Le Lendemain matin, chansonnette, lyrics and music by Delormel and Garnier, 1884	 	
 À trente-cinq ans, chansonnette, lyrics and music by Delormel and Garnier, 1885 	
 De c'côté-ci, de c'côté-là !, chansonnette, lyrics and music by Delormel and Garnier, 1885	 	
 En v'nant de Montmorency, chanson, lyrics and music by Delormel and Garnier, 1885	 	
 La Montre en argent, chansonnette, lyrics and music by Delormel and Garnier, 1885

 Exploits d'huissier, monologue by Garnier and Charles-Albert d'Appy, 1885
 Le Signe de la croix and Ah ! qu'j'ai mal au pied, 2 monologues comiques by Garnier and d'Appy, 1885
 Briscard et Pitou, duo-bouffe, lyrics by Garnier and d'Appy, music by Léopold Gangloff, 1886
 , lyrics by Delormel and Garnier, music by Louis-César Desormes, 1886
 Je vends du Kina-Tarascon, monologue, lyrics by Delormel and Garnier, répertoire Paulus, 1887
 Le Père la Victoire, lyrics by Delormel and Garnier, music by Louis Ganne, répertoire Paulus, 1888
 Adrien et Galimard, chansonnette comique, lyrics and music by Delormel and Garnier, 1888	 	
 Le Billet de cinq-cent francs, chansonnette, lyrics and music by Delormel and Garnier, 1888	
 Le Bureau des naissances, chansonnette-monologue, lyrics and music by Delormel and Garnier, 1888	 	
 Le Gueusard de Fouinard !, chansonnette comique, lyrics and music by Delormel and Garnier, 1888		
 Je n'marche pas, chansonnette, lyrics and music by Delormel and Garnier, 1888	 	
 Mon ami Poireau, chansonnette comique, lyrics and music by Delormel and Garnier, 1888	 	
 Mon billet de faveur, chansonnette comique, lyrics and music by Delormel and Garnier, 1888		 
 Mon gosse, chansonnette comique, lyrics and music by Delormel and Garnier, 1888 		
 La Pièce militaire, chansonnette, lyrics and music by Delormel and Garnier, 1888 	 	
 Ah ! non… j'vas r'miser, chansonnette, lyrics and music by Delormel and Garnier, 1889		 	
 Argent à placer, chansonnette comique, lyrics and music by Delormel and Garnier, 1889		
 Bœuf à l'huile, chansonnette comique, lyrics and music by Delormel and Garnier, 1889		 	
 Dégouté des pochards, scène comique avec parlé, lyrics and music by Delormel and Garnier, 1889	 	
 Les Déménagements d'Ugène, grande chansonnette comique, lyrics and music by Delormel and Garnier, 1889
 Le Départ du tapin, romance comique, lyrics and music by Delormel and Garnier, 1889 		 	
 Une femme discrète, chansonnette comique, lyrics and music by Delormel and Garnier, 1889	
 Un homme méfiant, chansonnette, lyrics and music by Delormel and Garnier, 1889	 	
 L'Invalide de Marseille, monologue comique, lyrics and music by Delormel and Garnier, 1889
 Le Journal bien informé, scène comique. lyrics and music by Delormel and Garnier, 1889	
 Priez pour elle, chansonnette comique, lyrics and music by Delormel and Garnier, 1889 		 	
 Si j'étais député !, grande scène comique à parlé, lyrics and music by Delormel and Garnier, 1889 	 
 Le Tribunal comique, scène comique. lyrics and music by Delormel and Garnier, 1889 	 	
 Vole, vole, mon cœur vole, chansonnette comique, lyrics and music by Delormel and Garnier, 1889		
 Y'a plus moyen d'rigoler, grande scène comique, lyrics and music by Delormel and Garnier, 1889	 	
 À Mèzidon, chansonnette comique, lyrics and music by Delormel and Garnier, 1890
 L'Alphabet comique, rondeau, lyrics and music by Delormel and Garnier, 1890	 	
 Les Bonnes à Bitard, scène comique, lyrics and music by Delormel and Garnier, 1890	
 C'est un fin de siècle, chansonnette, lyrics and music by Delormel and Garnier, 1890
 Chez le commissaire, scène comique, lyrics and music by Delormel and Garnier, 1890
 La Création de Nini, chansonnette, lyrics and music by Delormel and Garnier, 1890
 De profondis, chansonnette comique, lyrics and music by Delormel and Garnier, 1890
 La Famille Beaucaillou, chansonnette, lyrics and music by Delormel and Garnier, 1890 	
 La Fille à Taupin, chansonnette comique. lyrics and music by Delormel and Garnier, 1890 	
 Gigolette, chansonnette, lyrics and music by Delormel and Garnier, 1890 	
 L'Homme aux 36 métiers, scène comique, lyrics and music by Delormel and Garnier, 1890		
 L'Homme proverbe, scène comique, lyrics and music by Delormel and Garnier, 1890	
 Jeanne m'a pris mon irrigateur, romance comique, lyrics and music by Delormel and Garnier, 1890		
 Les Mardis de ma femme, scène comique à parlé, lyrics and music by Delormel and Garnier, 1890	 	
 Montpernasse, chansonnette comique, lyrics and music by Delormel and Garnier, 1890 	
 Nos artistes, chansonnette, lyrics and music by Delormel and Garnier, 1890	
 Oui p'pa, oui m'man, chansonnette comique, lyrics and music by Delormel and Garnier, 1890	 	
 Le Rembrandt de Landerneau, chansonnette, lyrics and music by Delormel and Garnier, 1890	 		
 Taupin chez la Marquise, chansonnette comique, lyrics and music by Delormel and Garnier, 1890	 	
 Le Tonneau de l'épicier, chanson, monologue, lyrics and music by Delormel and Garnier, 1890
 La Valse des bas noirs, song written with Gaston Maquis, (1890 ?)
 Alcazar d'été, revue fin de siècle by Léon Garnier, 1890	 	
 Ça manque de femmes, chansonnette, lyrics and music by Delormel and Garnier, 1891 	
 Le Chien de la cocotte, chansonnette, lyrics and music by Delormel and Garnier, 1891	 	
 Le Chien de Montauban, chansonnette, lyrics and music by Delormel and Garnier, 1891	 	
 De Falaise à Paris, chansonnette comique, lyrics and music by Delormel and Garnier, 1891
 Les Débuts de Lapocheté, scène comique, lyrics and music by Delormel and Garnier, 1891
 Et moi z'aussi, chansonnette, lyrics and music by Delormel and Garnier, 1891
 Une femme qui ne vient pas ! monologue, lyrics and music by Delormel and Garnier, 1891
 La Langue d'Ève, chansonnette, lyrics and music by Delormel and Garnier, 1891
 Une leçon d'argot, chansonnette, lyrics and music by Delormel and Garnier, 1891	
 Lohengrin, chansonnette comique, lyrics and music by Delormel and Garnier, 1891
 Ma petite Antoinette, chansonnette comique, lyrics and music by Delormel and Garnier, 1891 	
 Mine, qu'il est à la coule !, scène comique, lyrics and music by Delormel and Garnier, 1891 	
 L'Omnibus de l'Odéon, chansonnette, lyrics and music by Delormel and Garnier, 1891	
 Le Pochard fin de siècle, scène comique, lyrics and music by Delormel and Garnier, 1891	
 Roman d'amour, chanson fin de siècle, lyrics and music by Delormel and Garnier, 1891	
 Samson et Dalila, complainte comique, lyrics and music by Delormel and Garnier, 1891	
 Le Soliste, chansonnette-monologue, lyrics and music by Delormel and Garnier, 1891
 Les Suicides d'Oscar, scène comique, lyrics and music by Delormel and Garnier, 1891
 Tous en grève, chansonnette, lyrics and music by Delormel and Garnier, 1891
 Trop gras, chansonnette, lyrics and music by Delormel and Garnier, 1891
 Le Tuyau !, scie, lyrics and music by Delormel and Garnier, 1891	
 Le Bébé de la boulangère, chansonnette, lyrics and music by Delormel and Garnier, 1892	
 Dix-neuf-vingt-cinq, chansonnette, lyrics and music by Delormel and Garnier, 1892 		
 La Femme tatouée, chansonnette comique, lyrics and music by Delormel and Garnier, 1892	
 Les Five o'clock de Théodore, scène comique, lyrics and music by Delormel and Garnier, 1892 	
 L'Homme tatoué, chanson comique, lyrics and music by Delormel and Garnier, 1892 	
 Les Impôts, monologue, lyrics and music by Delormel and Garnier, 1892 	
 L'Interview du poivrot, chansonnette, lyrics and music by Delormel and Garnier, 1892 	
 Ma sœur Angèle, chansonnette, lyrics and music by Delormel and Garnier, 1892 	
 Le Poivrot de Laricot, scène comique, lyrics and music by Delormel and Garnier, 1892
 Priez pour eux !, complainte comique, lyrics and music by Delormel and Garnier, 1892	 	
 Quand on voit ça !, chansonnette, lyrics and music by Delormel and Garnier, 1892	
 Rigolard et Pleurnichard, chansonnette, lyrics and music by Delormel and Garnier, 1892	
 Le Séminariste, chansonnette, lyrics and music by Delormel and Garnier, 1892	 	
 La Sentinelle rageuse, chansonnette comique, lyrics and music by Delormel and Garnier, 1892 	
 Les Souvenirs d'Alphonse, romance naturaliste, lyrics and music by Delormel and Garnier, 1892 	
 Le Zéro, chansonnette, lyrics and music by Delormel and Garnier, 1892 	
 Le Cocher syndiqué, chansonnette, lyrics and music by Delormel and Garnier, 1893 
 La Licence des grues, chansonnette, lyrics by Delormel and Garnier, 1893
 La Maison de campagne, scène a parlé, lyrics and music by Delormel and Garnier, 1893
 Le Régisseur, grande scène à parlé, lyrics and music by Delormel and Garnier, 1893 	
 Les Rêves de Nez-sale, scène à parlé, lyrics and music by Delormel and Garnier, 1893
 T'as raison !, chansonnette, lyrics and music by Delormel and Garnier, 1893
 Le Travail de huit heures, chansonnette, lyrics and music by Delormel and Garnier, 1893 
 Qui veut des plumes de paon ? ou Zizi pan pan, chansonnette, lyrics and music by Delormel and Garnier, 1893
 Une conquête militaire, chansonnette, lyrics and music by Delormel and Garnier, 1894	 	
 Dialogue nocturne, monologue, lyrics and music by Delormel and Garnier, 1894
 Le Lapin calculateur, monologue, lyrics by Delormel and Garnier, 1894
 J'aime Cunégonde, monologue, lyrics by Delormel and Garnier, 1894
 Le Potache épaté, monologue, lyrics by Delormel and Garnier, 1894	
 Les Enfants de Martinet, grande scène à parlé, lyrics and music by Delormel and Garnier, 1894		
 Mamzell' Françoise, chansonnette, lyrics and music by Delormel and Garnier, 1894		
 Mon frère de lait, chansonnette comique avec parlé, lyrics and music by Delormel and Garnier, 1894
 L'Oublieux, scène comique, lyrics and music by Delormel and Garnier, 1894	 	
 Le Portrait de Margot, lyrics and music by Garnier and Blérigne, 1894	
 Le Rôle de l'état, chansonnette, lyrics and music by Delormel and Garnier, 1894	 	
 Vous allez l'entendre, scène comique, lyrics and music by Delormel and Garnier, 1894		 	
 L'Amour à la vapeur, chansonnette, lyrics and music by Battaille, Garnier and Darsay, 1895		
 Plus de mémoire ! chansonnette, lyrics and music by Garnier and Jost, 1895		 	
 La Sale Rosse !, chansonnette, lyrics and music by Garnier and Jost, 1895
 Hardi ! les bleus !, épisode des guerres vendéennes, opéra comique in 2 acts by Léon Garnier and Albert Lhoste, music by Justin Clérice, 1895  
 La Queue du diable, pièce fantastique in 2 acts, by Léon Garnier and Eugène Héros, music by Alfred Patusset, 1896
 Le Déserteur, chanson, lyrics and music by Garnier, Jost, Ouvrard, 1896
 Les Pilules de Courant d'air, grande scène comique, lyrics by Louis Tournayre, 1898	 	
 Les Sabines, scène comique, lyrics and music by Delormel and Garnier, 1898 	
 Les Trois Pèlerins, scène comique, lyrics byHenri Darsay and Fabrice Lemon, music by Garnier, 1898
 U. V. D. C., opérette bouffe in 1 act, by Léon Garnier and Henry Drucker, music by Gaston Maquis, 1898
 L'Épingle, lyrics by Garnier and Jeunil, music by Bunel and Garnier, 1900	 	
 La Jambe de Ferdinand, lyrics and music by Garnier, Delattre, Jeunil and Doubis, 1900	
 Un Amant de cœur, comédie-pantalonnade in 1 act, with Trébla, 1900 	
 Les Boyaudiers !, lyrics by Léon Garnier, music by Adolphe Stanislas and Garnier, 1901 	 	
 L'Enfant de Puteaux !, lyrics by de Garnier and Arnoudt, music by G. Bunel and Garnier, 1901
 Les Avariétés de l'année, review in 2 acts and 4 tableaux by Léon Garnier, 1901
 Le Responsable, plaidoyer social in 1 act, by Léon Garnier and Édouard Loisel, 1904 
 De Paris à Madagascar'', revue comique in four big tableaux by Léon Garnier and Fernand Bessier (undated)

External links 
 recordings by Léon Garnier sur Phonobase.org

French lyricists
Musicians from Lyon
1856 births
1905 deaths
19th-century French male musicians